The 2007 ACC Men's Basketball Season began on November 7, 2006, in College Park, Maryland, USA.  It started when Maryland played  in a non-conference game. The conference schedule began on December 3, 2006, in Charlottesville, Virginia where Virginia defeated  67–62. Following the season the 2007 ACC men's basketball tournament took place in Tampa, Florida with North Carolina claiming the crown.

Final standings

Notes
 UNC and UVA shared the regular season title.
 Teams tied in the standings are ranked by non-conference record.

Statistical leaders

Players of the week
Throughout the conference season, the ACC offices name a player and rookie of the week.  The MVP of the ACC tournament is the automatic winner of the final ACC player of the week of each season.

ACC-Big Ten Challenge
November 27
N.C. State 74, Michigan 67

November 28
Maryland 72, Illinois 66 
Wisconsin 81, Florida State 66
Georgia Tech 77, Penn State 73
Duke 54, Indiana 51
Northwestern 61, Miami 59

November 29
Boston College 65, Michigan State 58
Purdue 61, Virginia 59
Virginia Tech 69, Iowa 65
North Carolina 98, Ohio State 89
Clemson 90, Minnesota 68
Wake Forest did not play.
ACC won 8–3

Conference honors 
ACC Conference awards were handed out at the conclusion of the regular season.

Player of the Year
Jared Dudley, Boston College

Rookie of the Year
Brandan Wright, North Carolina

Coach of the Year
Dave Leitao, Virginia

Defensive Player of the Year
Jamon Gordon, Virginia Tech

All-Atlantic Coast Conference
First Team
Jared Dudley, Sr., Boston College
Tyler Hansbrough, So., North Carolina
Al Thornton, Sr., Florida State
Sean Singletary, Jr., Virginia
Zabian Dowdell, Sr., Virginia Tech

Second Team
J. R. Reynolds, Sr., Virginia
D. J. Strawberry, Sr., Maryland
Tyrese Rice, So., Boston College
Josh McRoberts, So., Duke
Brandan Wright, Fr., North Carolina

Third Team
Kyle Visser, Sr., Wake Forest
Javaris Crittenton, Fr., Georgia Tech
Brandon Costner, Fr., North Carolina State
Jamon Gordon, Sr., Virginia Tech
Jack McClinton, So., Miami

Honorable Mention:
Ben McCauley, So., NCSU; James Mays, Jr., Clem.; DeMarcus Nelson, Jr., Duke; James Gist, Jr., MD;  Ekene Ibekwe, Sr., MD

All-ACC Freshman team
Brandan Wright, North Carolina
Javaris Crittenton, Georgia Tech
Brandon Costner, North Carolina State
Jon Scheyer, Duke
Ty Lawson, North Carolina

All-ACC Defensive team
Jamon Gordon, Sr., Virginia Tech
Zabian Dowdell, Sr., Virginia Tech
Ekene Ibekwe, Sr., Maryland
D. J. Strawberry, Sr., Maryland
Josh McRoberts, So., Duke

ACC tournament 
See 2007 ACC men's basketball tournament

Postseason

NCAA tournament 

ACC Record: 7–7

1 North Carolina (3–1) – Elite Eight
W 16 Eastern Kentucky 86–65
W 9 Michigan State 81–67
W 5 USC 74–64
L 2 Georgetown 84–96 (OT)

4 Virginia (1–1)
W 13 Albany 84–57
L 5 Tennessee 74–77

4 Maryland (1–1)
W 13 Davidson 82–70
L 5 Butler 59–62

5 Virginia Tech (1–1)
W 12 Illinois 54–52
L 4 Southern Illinois 48–63

6 Duke (0–1)
L 11 Virginia Commonwealth 77–79

7 Boston College (1–1)
W 10 Texas Tech 84–75
L 2 Georgetown 55–62

10 Georgia Tech (0–1)
L 7 UNLV 63–67

NIT 

ACC Record: 8–3

1 Clemson (4–1) – Runner-Up
W 8 East Tennessee State 64–57
W 4 Ole Miss 89–68
W 2 Syracuse 74–70
W 1 Air Force 68–67
L 1 West Virginia 73–78

2 Florida State (2–1)
W 7 Toledo 77–61
W 3 Michigan 87–66
L 1 Mississippi State 71–86

6 North Carolina State (2–1)
W 3 Drexel 63–56
W 7 Marist 69–62
L 1 West Virginia 66–71

References